Calceolaria harlingii is a species of plant in the Calceolariaceae family. It is endemic to Ecuador.

References

Endemic flora of Ecuador
harlingii
Vulnerable plants
Taxonomy articles created by Polbot